Pakhangyi Monastery, officially known as Kyaungdawgyi is a Buddhist monastery in Yesagyo Township, Magway Region, Myanmar (Burma). The wooden monastery was built by Pho Toke and Daw Phae, and was built using 254 teak pillars that range from  each in height. The monastery was restored in 1992, In 1996, the Burmese government submitted the monastery, along with other exemplars from the Konbaung dynasty for inclusion into the World Heritage List.

See also
Kyaung

References

Monasteries in Myanmar
Buildings and structures in Magway Region
19th-century Buddhist temples
Religious buildings and structures completed in 1886
1886 establishments in Burma